Giuseppe Buratti (3 November 1929 – 26 May 2008) was an Italian road cyclist. He most notably won the mountains classification at the 1955 Vuelta a España.

Major results
1954
 1st Giro delle Alpi Apuane
 3rd Nice–Mont Agel
 4th Giro dell'Appennino
 7th Tre Valli Varesine
1955
 3rd Nice–Mont Agel
 8th Overall Vuelta a España
1st  Mountains classification
1956
 3rd Giro dell'Appennino

References

1929 births
2008 deaths
Italian male cyclists
Cyclists from the Metropolitan City of Milan